Damerower See is a lake in Ludwigslust-Parchim, Mecklenburg-Vorpommern, Germany. At an elevation of 47.5 m, its surface area is 2.85 km².

External links 
 

Lakes of Mecklenburg-Western Pomerania